Glynn railway station serves Glynn in County Antrim, Northern Ireland. The station opened on 1 January 1864.

Service
Some peak-time trains do not call at Glynn station.

On Sundays there is a service every two hours in either direction to Larne Harbour or Great Victoria Street.

References

Railway stations in County Antrim
Railway stations opened in 1864
Railway stations served by NI Railways
Railway stations in Northern Ireland opened in the 19th century